Fryderyk Pautsch (22 September 1877, Deliatyn - 1 July 1950, Kraków) was an Austrian-Polish painter; associated with the Young Poland movement.

Life and work 
In 1898, he began his studies in jurisprudence at the University of Lemberg (now the University of Lviv), followed by advanced legal studies at the Jagiellonian University in Krakau. For reasons unknown, he decided to pursue a career in art instead. Pursuant to this goal, he enrolled at the local Academy of Fine Arts. His instructors included Leon Wyczółkowski and Józef Unierzyski. 

Thanks to a scholarship, he was able to study in Paris, at the Académie Julian, from 1905 to 1906. When he returned, he settled in Lemberg, but paid frequent visits to Pokuttia (southeast Galicia), where he painted scenes featuring the Hutsul people and their culture. In 1908, he became a member of the Society of Polish Artists ("Sztuka"). Four years later, he joined the Vienna Hagenbund. He exhibited frequently, under the name "Friedrich Pautsch", notably at the Große Berliner Kunstausstellung of 1914, where he presented seventeen works.

During World War I, he served in the Polish Legion, an independent unit within the Austro-Hungarian Army. He would hold that position until shortly after the war ended. In 1919, he left Breslau to accept the post of Director of the school of arts and crafts in Poznań. There, he was one of the founders of an artists' association known as "Świt", or "Morgenröte" (Dawn). 

In 1925, he was appointed a Professor at the academy in Krakau (now Kraków). He served as the Rector there in 1931 and 1936. In the latter year, he was awarded the Knight's Cross in the Order of Polonia Restituta. After the war, he returned to his position as Professor at the academy, which he held until his death.

References

Further reading 
 Mieczysław Wallis-Walfisz, "Pautsch, Fryderyk", In: Allgemeines Lexikon der Bildenden Künstler von der Antike bis zur Gegenwart, Vol. 26: Olivier–Pieris, pgs.318-319, E. A. Seemann, Leipzig 1932
 Wielkopolska Biographical Dictionary, Państwowe Wydawn, 1983, pp. 558–559 
 "Pautsch, Fryderyk", In: Hans Vollmer (Ed.): Allgemeines Lexikon der bildenden Künstler des XX. Jahrhunderts, Vol.3: K–P. E. A. Seemann, Leipzig 1956, pg.557

External links 

 Biography by Irena Kossowska @ Culture.pl
 Biographical Timeline and works @ Art Lviv Online
 Works by Pautsch @ the Galeria Malarstwa Polskiego
 More works by Pautsch @ ArtNet

1877 births
1950 deaths
Austrian painters
Polish painters
Genre painters
Académie Julian
Polish legionnaires (World War I)
Recipients of the Order of Polonia Restituta
People from Ivano-Frankivsk Oblast